Minnesota State University, Mankato is a public university in Mankato, Minnesota.

Minnesota State University may also refer to:

Minnesota State University Moorhead, the public university in Moorhead, Minnesota
Minnesota State Colleges and Universities System, the largest higher education system of the state of Minnesota